The International Mathematical Knowledge Trust (IMKT) is an international under construction organization with the goal to make available the totality of mathematical knowledge in digital form. The organization will work in a partnership between International Mathematical Union, University of Waterloo and Alfred P. Sloan Foundation.

References

External links
 International Mathematical Knowledge Trust's official website

Mathematical societies